Suzong is the temple name used for several emperors of China. It may refer to:

Emperor Zhang of Han (57–88)
Emperor Xiaoming of Northern Wei (510–528)
Emperor Xiaozhao of Northern Qi (535–561)
Emperor Suzong of Tang (711–762)

See also 
Sukjong (disambiguation), Korean equivalent
Túc Tông (disambiguation), Vietnamese equivalent

Temple name disambiguation pages